Peekaboo (also spelled peek-a-boo) is a form of play played with an infant. To play, one player hides their face, pops back into the view of the other, and says Peekaboo!, sometimes followed by I see you!  There are many variations: for example, where trees are involved, "Hiding behind that tree!" is sometimes added. Another variation involves saying "Where's the baby?" while the face is covered and "There's the baby!" when uncovering the face.

Peekaboo uses the fundamental structure of all good jokes—surprise, balanced with expectation. 

Peekaboo is thought by developmental psychologists to demonstrate an infant's inability to understand object permanence. Object permanence is an important stage of cognitive development for infants. In early sensorimotor stages, the infant is completely unable to comprehend object permanence. Psychologist Jean Piaget conducted experiments with infants which led him to conclude that this awareness was typically achieved at eight to nine months of age. He claimed that infants before this age are too young to understand object permanence. A lack of object permanence can lead to A-not-B errors, where children reach for a thing at a place where it should not be.

Linguist Iris Nomikou has compared the game to a dialogue given the predictable back-and-forth pattern. Other researchers have called the game “protoconversation" – a way to teach an infant the timing and the structure of social exchanges.

See also

Infant cognitive development

References

Further reading

Children's games